Elonis v. United States, 575 U.S. 723 (2015), was a United States Supreme Court case concerning whether conviction of threatening another person over interstate lines (under 18 U.S.C. § 875(c)) requires proof of subjective intent to threaten or whether it is enough to show that a "reasonable person" would regard the statement as threatening. In controversy were the purported threats of violent rap lyrics written by Anthony Douglas Elonis and posted to Facebook under a pseudonym. The ACLU filed an amicus brief in support of the petitioner. It was the first time the Court has heard a case considering true threats and the limits of speech on social media.

Background 
Elonis was in the process of divorce and made a number of public Facebook posts.

He "posted the script of a sketch" by The Whitest Kids U' Know, which originally referenced saying "I want  To kill the President of the United States" and replaced the president with his wife:

Elonis ended the post with this statement: "Art is about pushing limits. I'm willing to go to jail for my constitutional rights. Are you?"

A week later, Elonis posted about local law enforcement and a kindergarten class, which caught the attention of the Federal Bureau of Investigation. Then, he wrote a post on Facebook about one of the agents who visited him:

He concluded:

The actions led to Elonis's indictment by a grand jury on five counts of threats to park employees and visitors, local law enforcement, his estranged wife, an FBI agent, and a kindergarten class that had been relayed through interstate communication.

At the district court, he moved to dismiss the indictment for failing to allege that he had intended to threaten anyone. His motion was denied. He requested a jury instruction that "the government must prove that he intended to communicate a true threat."  which was also denied.

He was convicted on the last four of the five counts. He was sentenced to 44 months in prison and three years on supervised release.

He appealed unsuccessfully to the circuit court of appeals, renewing his challenge to the jury instructions.

He appealed to the Supreme Court based on lack of any attempt to show intent to threaten and on First Amendment rights.

Decision
On June 1, 2015, the Supreme Court reversed Elonis's conviction in an 8–1 decision. Chief Justice John G. Roberts wrote for a seven-justice majority, Samuel Alito authored an opinion concurring in part and dissenting in part, and Clarence Thomas authored a dissenting opinion.  The finding of the circuit court was reversed and the matter remanded.

Majority opinion
The majority opinion, written by Roberts, did not rule on First Amendment matters or on the question of whether recklessness was sufficient mens rea to show intent. It ruled that mens rea was required to prove the commission of a crime under §875(c).

Importantly, the mens rea issue had been preserved for review, since Elonis had raised that objection at every stage of the previous proceedings.

The government contended that the presence of the words "intent to extort" in §875(b) and §875(d) implied that the absence in §875(c) was constructive. The court disagreed, holding that the absence of the language in §875(c) was because the section was intended to have a broader scope than threats relating to extortion.

The opinion drew on many Supreme Court cases that held that in criminal law, mens rea was required though it had not been mentioned explicitly in statute.

Consequently, the court ruled in favor of Elonis.

Alito's concurrence
Samuel Alito, concurring in part and dissenting in part, opined that while agreeing that mens rea was required and specifically that showing negligence was not sufficient, the court should have ruled on the question of recklessness. He further opined that recklessness was sufficient to show a crime under that provision on the basis that going further would amount to amending the statute, rather than interpreting it. Since Elonis explicitly argued that recklessness was not sufficient, Alito said:

Alito also addressed the First Amendment question, elided by the majority opinion. He held that "lyrics in songs that are performed for an audience or sold in recorded form are unlikely to be interpreted as a real threat to a real person.... Statements on social media that are pointedly directed at their victims, by contrast, are much more likely to be taken seriously."

Thomas's dissent
Clarence Thomas, dissenting, wrote against discarding the "general intent" standard without replacing it with a clearer standard.

Thomas argued that "there is no historical practice requiring more than general intent when a statute regulates speech."

Thomas cited Rosen, arguing that general intent was sufficient in this case. However, the majority opinion offers refutation in that Rosen turned on ignorance of the law: knowledge as to whether material was legally obscene, not on whether it was intended to be obscene. He also supported the government's claim that the presence of "intent to extort" language in the adjacent §875(b) and did not address the majority's reasoning on that language.

Thomas used precedent, notably from the states and 18th-century England based on other but similar and, arguably, influencing legislation to support his "general intent" claim. Thomas also drew a parallel with general intent in tort. While he sought to address the First Amendment issues, he never strayed far from "general intent."

Aftermath

Following the ruling, Elonis' conviction was overturned. However, the Court of Appeals subsequently “conclude[d] beyond a reasonable doubt that Elonis would have been convicted if the jury had been properly instructed” and his conviction was reinstated.

See also
 Rule of lenity

Footnotes

External links
 

United States Free Speech Clause case law
United States Supreme Court cases
United States Supreme Court cases of the Roberts Court

2015 in United States case law